Imāmzādeh Hamzah is an Imamzadeh mosque complex in Tabrīz, Iran. The mosque contains the grave of Hamzah, son of the Twelver Shī‘ah Imām, Mūsā' al-Kādhim.

Location
The Imāmzādeh Hamzah mosque is located in the Sheshghelan suburb of Tabrīz next to Maqbaratoshoara and the Museum of Ostad Bohtouni. It is also near Amir Nezam House, House of Seghat ol Islam and Saheb ol Amr Mosque.

History

Sayyid Abi al-Qasim Hamzah is a son of Imam Musa ibn Ja'far al-Kadhim who is credited for the genealogy of the Saffavids. Hence, the Imāmzādeh Hamzah is a "de facto ancestral cemetery". Thus, it strengthens the notability of its link to the mosque in Ardabil where the elite Saffavids have been buried. The style of decoration of the Hamzah Mosque is further enhanced and has therefore enjoyed sustained patronage.

Description
The exquisite mausoleum dates back to the 14th century (8th century Hijri yearAH), with influence from the Safavid and Qajar dynasties and is thus a pilgrimage centre.

The extensive mirror work within the mosque is common to many of the Imamzadeh throughout Iran.

See also
 List of Mosques in Iran
 Imamzadeh
 Sayyid Mir Jan
 Maqbaratoshoara
 The Amir Nezam House
 Behnam House
 House of Seghat ol Islam
 Constitutional House of Tabriz

References 

 eachto.ir

External links 

 Virtual Museum of Historical Buildings of Tabriz ([ School of Architecture, Tabriz Islamic Art University]).
 Tabriz Islamic Art University (دانشگاه هنر اسلامی تبریز), Tabriz, Iran (in Persian). []
 Iranian Student's Tourism & Traveling Agency, ISTTA. (English), (Persian)

Mosques in Tabriz
Safavid architecture
14th-century mosques
Religious buildings and structures with domes